Siu Lam is an area and a village in Tuen Mun District, Hong Kong.

Administration
Siu Lam is one of the 36 villages represented within the Tuen Mun Rural Committee. For electoral purposes, Siu Lam is part of the So Kwun Wat constituency.

References

External links

 Delineation of area of existing village Siu Lam (Tuen Mun) for election of resident representative (2019 to 2022)

Populated places in Hong Kong
Tuen Mun District
Villages in Tuen Mun District, Hong Kong